S. V. Ramadas (1921-2004) was an Indian actor who appeared in Tamil-language films, most often as a villain. He acted in more than 700 films in a career spanning over four decades.

Film career 
Among popular movies, he acted in  Aayirathil Oruvan (1965), Nam Naadu (1969), Karnan (1964), Kuzhanthaikkaga (1968) and Punnagai (1971). He acted with a variety of actors including M. G. Ramachandran, Sivaji Ganesan, Gemini Ganesan, Ravichandran, Jaishankar, R. Muthuraman, Rajnikanth, Kamal Haasan, Sarathkumar, Arjun and many more.

Partial filmography

Death 
He died on August 8, 2004, following a brief illness. He was survived by his three sons.

References 

Male actors in Tamil cinema
1921 births
2004 deaths
Date of birth missing
Place of birth missing